Zabardust Khan Tanoli also known by his nick-name Suba Khan Tanoli was a chieftain of the  Nawab Tanoli tribe, of the Hazara region, in 18th century Mughal India. He fought at the Third Battle of Panipat and his intelligence, rifles and zamburak artillery skills contributed to the Afghan victory. He played a considerable part with Ahmed Shah Abdali to fighting against the Sikh and Hindu Jats.

Zabardust Khan was appointed a nazim (area administrator or Governor) in upper Hazara, Kashmir by the Afghan King Taimur Shah Durrani (or Abdali) in 1775 or 1776. The name "Suba" was given to him by the Afghan King Ahmed Shah Abdali, known as (Khan of Suba) i.e. Subahdar.

He was a good administrator during a very violent period. He tried his best to help people, ensure peace in his area and control prices of food and other resources. For this reason, he is still remembered by people in that area today. He was the ruler of Tanawal valley at his time, which is also known as Amb.

Suba Khan Tanoli died in 1783. After his death, the next ruler was Mir Haibat Khan Tanoli. Mir Haibat Khan Tanoli, who was the grandfather of Painda Khan Tanoli and father of Mir Nawab Tanoli.

March against Suraj Mal
Suba Khan's support towards Ahmed Shah Durrani's invasion of Maharaja Suraj Mal's Kingdom was very reliable. In the Battle of Bharatpur, the army of Suba Khan and his combating gun powder, denied the lead to Suraj Mal's army, resulting in an Afghan victory.

Tomb of Suba Khan

Due to several invasions the tomb of Suba Khan Tanoli was badly damaged.

References

Hindkowan people
Nawabs of Amb
Princely rulers of Pakistan
1797 deaths
1736 births